Geo. F. Trumper is a British men's barber and perfumer in London, England, which sells its own brand of men's fragrances and personal grooming products. It was established in 1875 by George Francis William Trumper as a Gentlemen's Barber Shop. George Trumper was not only an excellent barber but also a master perfumer, and he soon gained a reputation as such among the gentlemen of London's elite.

Locations
Geo. F. Trumper operates two retail locations in London. The first one is in the original shop at 9 Curzon Street in Mayfair, and the second one is at 1 Duke of York Street in St James's. At the shop in Curzon Street, the interior retains the original mahogany cubicles and glass display cases that were installed in the 20th century. The firm's head office is located at 166 Fairbridge Road in north London.

Products

The items sold by Geo. F. Trumper include shaving equipment and shaving creams, hair care products, aftershaves and colognes, as well as men's accessories like cufflinks, hair brushes and leather goods.

The firm's most famous colognes have names such as Astor, Wellington, Curzon, Wild Fern, Skye, Eucris, Sandalwood, Eau de Quinine, Spanish Leather, Marlborough, Ajaccio Violets, Extract of Limes, Eau de Portugal and Bay Rum. Skye was created to celebrate the coronation of one of the kings, Sandalwood was created to celebrate the Jubilee of Her Majesty Queen Elizabeth II, and GFT celebrates 125 years of Trumper's success. Each bottle is topped with the famous Trumper Crown.

In popular culture
Evelyn Waugh refers to Geo. F. Trumper in his novel Brideshead Revisited, when he writes that Rex Mottram sends for a man from the establishment to shave Charles Ryder, Sebastian Flyte and Boy Mulcaster after they were held in jail on charges of driving while intoxicated.

In the James Bond novel On Her Majesty's Secret Service, Ian Fleming mentions a fragrance by Geo. F. Trumper, when Bond visits Marc-Ange Draco in Marseille and finds a bottle of Eucris in his bathroom.

In John le Carré's novel Tinker Tailor Soldier Spy, George Smiley is intercepted by a disagreeable minor character who had just had his hair cut at Trumper's establishment in Curzon Street.

In the "How Does Your Garden Grow?" episode of Agatha Christie's Poirot (season 3, episode 1), Hercule Poirot is seen leaving Trumper's Curzon Street shop after buying a fragrance there.

References

External links

Geo. F. Trumper website
Shaving in London, New York Times, 8 January 2006.
James Bond Lifestyle

British hairdressers
Shops in London
Retail companies established in 1875
Luxury brands
Barbers
Buildings and structures in Mayfair